Rowlett High School is a public secondary school located in Rowlett, Texas (USA). Rowlett High School enrolls students in grades 9-12 and is a part of the Garland Independent School District. The school opened in the fall of 1996 with Marlene Hammerle as principal. It is the second newest high school in the district. In 2005, Rowlett High School was recognized by Newsweek on their "Top 1,000 High Schools In The Nation" list, which is based on Advance Placement scores. Also, Rowlett has won the "Top PTSA" award and the "Highest Attendance" award for their district numerous times.

In 2009, 2010, 2011, and 2012, the school was rated "recognized" by the Texas Education Agency.

Garland ISD is a "Free Choice" school district, which allows the parents to choose which school their children want to attend within the district.

Academics

The school's course offerings include regular, college preparatory, and career and technology courses.

Statistics (per 2009)
The attendance rate for students at the school is 96%, equal to the state average of 96%. 23% of the students at Rowlett are economically disadvantaged, 8% enroll in special education, 7% enroll in gifted and talent programs, 40% are enrolled in career and technology programs, and 3% are considered "limited English proficient."

The ethnic makeup of the school is 54% White, non-Hispanic, 24% Hispanic, 15% African American, 8% Asian/Pacific Islander, and less than 1% Native American.

The average class sizes at Rowlett are 24 students for English, 24 for foreign language, 24 for math, 22 for science, and 26 for social studies.

Teachers at the school carry, on average, 10 years of teaching experience and 4% of the teachers on staff are first-year teachers.

Exit Level TAKS Scores (% Passed)
Reading - 99%,
Math - 97%,
Social Studies - 100%,
Science - 98%

Extracurricular activities
The 2011 National Champion Rowlett Silver Rhythm Dancers (Drill Team) were featured in the Super Bowl XLV halftime show with the Black Eyed Peas.

Athletics
The sports Rowlett offers are baseball, basketball, bowling, cross country, football, golf, marching band, soccer, softball, tennis, track, and volleyball. The boys' track and field team placed first at the UIL 5A State Track & Field Championship Meet on May 10, 2008, but won their first track and field district team title in 1999 in the 3rd year of the school's existence. They won a second state title in track and field the next year at the UIL 5A State Track & Field Championship Meet.
Rowlett High School resides in the UIL 5A Classification for the 2013-2014 school year, but will be reclassified under the UIL 6A Region 2 District 11 Classification for the 2014-2015 school year.

Notable alumni
 Jason Castro - contestant on season seven of American Idol.
 Kyle Clemons - Olympic sprinter, gold medalist in 4x400-meter relay in 2016 Summer Olympics
 Marquise Goodwin - Olympic Long Jumper and NFL Wide Receiver for the Seattle Seahawks
 Damontre Moore - former NFL Defensive End and current Defensive End for Toronto Argonauts
 Steven Okert - Major League Baseball pitcher for the Miami Marlins
 Charles Omenihu - NFL Defensive End for the San Francisco 49ers
 Jane Slater - NFL Network Reporter covering the Dallas Cowboys
 Zach Wood - NFL Long Snapper for the New Orleans Saints

See also
Garland, Texas
List of high schools in Texas

References

External links

Garland Independent School District

Garland Independent School District high schools
Educational institutions established in 1996
Rowlett, Texas
Public high schools in Texas
1996 establishments in Texas